The 2015 Upper Austrian state election was held on 27 September 2015 to elect the members of the Landtag of Upper Austria.

The election saw major losses for the Austrian People's Party (ÖVP) and Social Democratic Party of Austria (SPÖ), the traditional major parties of Austrian politics. This was matched by huge gains for the right-wing populist Freedom Party of Austria (FPÖ), which doubled its vote share to 30% and overtook the SPÖ to become the second largest party. The Greens also made small gains, while the liberal NEOS – The New Austria (NEOS) failed to enter the Landtag on its first attempt, taking 3.5%.

Background
The Upper Austrian constitution mandates that cabinet positions in the state government (state councillors) be allocated between parties proportionally in accordance with the share of votes won by each; this is known as Proporz. As such, the government is a perpetual coalition of all parties that qualify for at least one state councillor. Despite this, parties still establish formal coalitions to organise cabinet positions and ensure a Landtag majority for legislative purposes.

In the 2009 state election, the ÖVP consolidated its lead over the SPÖ, which suffered a huge loss of 13.4 percentage points. Meanwhile, the ÖVP came up one seat short of an absolute majority. The FPÖ also made substantial gains (6.9 points) and moved into third place ahead of the Greens. The ÖVP won five councillors, the SPÖ two, the FPÖ one, and the Greens one. The ÖVP formed a coalition with the Greens.

Electoral system
The 56 seats of the Landtag of Upper Austria are elected via open list proportional representation in a two-step process. The seats are distributed between five multi-member constituencies. For parties to receive any representation in the Landtag, they must either win at least one seat in a constituency directly, or clear a 4 percent state-wide electoral threshold. Seats are distributed in constituencies according to the Hare quota, with any remaining seats allocated using the D'Hondt method at the state level, to ensure overall proportionality between a party's vote share and its share of seats.

Contesting parties
The table below lists parties represented in the previous Landtag.

In addition to the parties already represented in the Landtag, three parties collected enough signatures to be placed on the ballot.

 NEOS – The New Austria (NEOS)
 Communist Party of Austria (KPÖ)
 Christian Party of Austria (CPÖ)

Results

Results by constituency

Aftermath
The result was a major breakthrough for the FPÖ, not least of all because the party captured three state councillors. This put pressure on the ÖVP, which no longer held a majority in the state government. They declared they were not willing to form a coalition which would only have a one-seat majority in the state government, essentially ruling out any coalition with either the SPÖ or Greens alone. The Greens pushed for a three-party coalition with the ÖVP and SPÖ, but Pühringer instead sought an agreement with the FPÖ. This was ultimately successful, though Pühringer distanced himself from the FPÖ, describing the situation as a "working agreement" rather than a coalition, stating that both parties were given great freedom to operate independently. The coalition was condemned by SPÖ federal Chancellor Werner Faymann, but supported by ÖVP Vice Chancellor Reinhold Mitterlehner. The new government took office on 23 October.

References

2015 elections in Austria
State elections in Austria
September 2015 events in Europe
Upper Austria